A consort of instruments was a phrase used in England during the 16th and 17th centuries to indicate an instrumental ensemble. These could be of the same or a variety of instruments. Consort music enjoyed considerable popularity at court and in households of the wealthy in the Elizabethan era, and many pieces were written for consorts by the major composers of the period. In the Baroque era consort music was absorbed into chamber music.

Definitions and forms
The earliest documented example of the English word 'consort' in a musical sense is in George Gascoigne’s The Princelye Pleasures (1576). Only from the mid-17th century has there been a clear distinction made between a ‘whole’, or ‘closed’ consort, that is, all instruments of the same family (for example, a set of viols played together) and a ‘mixed’, or ‘broken’ consort, consisting of instruments from various families (for example viols and lute).

Major forms of music composed for consorts included fantasias, cantus firmus settings (including In nomines), variations, dances or ayres, and fantasia suites.

Major composers
Composers of consort music during the Elizabethan era include John Dowland, Anthony Holborne, Osbert Parsley, and William Byrd. The principal Jacobean era composers included Thomas Lupo, Orlando Gibbons, John Coprario, and Alfonso Ferrabosco. William Lawes was a principal composer during the Caroline era.  Later 17th-century composers included John Jenkins, Christopher Simpson, Matthew Locke and Henry Purcell.

Modern consorts
In modern times, a number of ensembles have adopted the term "consort" in their names:

Armonico Consort
The Baltimore Consort
B-Five Recorder Consort
Catacoustic Consort
The Consort of Musicke
Dunedin Consort
Early Music Consort of London
Gaia Consort
The Harp Consort
The King's Consort
Leonhardt-Consort
Locke Brass Consort
The Newberry Consort
Orlando Consort
The Paul Winter Consort
Quadriga Consort
Ricercar Consort
Rose Consort of Viols
Sherwood Consort
Southern Consort of Voices
Taverner Consort
The Tudor Consort

See also
Chest of viols

Notes

External links
Video of consort of viols
Robins, Brian. "The English Viol Consort in the Tudor Era"
2008 Viol Extravaganza Collection of viol consort videos (YouTube)